Lesetja Kganyago (born 7 October 1965) is a South African economist and central banker. He is the Governor of the South African Reserve Bank (SARB). He was appointed to that post on 6 October 2014, by Jacob Zuma, the former President of the Republic of South Africa (RSA). He assumed the Governorship of the South African Reserve Bank on 9 November 2014, following the expiry of the term of his predecessor Gill Marcus, on 8 November 2014.

Background and education
Kganyago was born in Boyne, Limpopo on 7 October 1965. He moved to Johannesburg with his mother, at the age of 18. For several semesters, he attended University of the Witwatersrand, but left before graduating. He completed his studies at the University of South Africa, in 1991, earning the degree of Bachelor of Commerce (BCom). He also holds the degree of Master of Science in Development Economics, from SOAS, University of London, obtained in 1994. 
 He also holds numerous certificates, and diplomas in management, economics and finance from Internationally recognized institutions, including the Wits Business School and Harvard University.

Career
Beginning in 1996 until 1998, Kganyago served as the Director of the South African National Treasury. From 1998 until January 2004, he served as the Chief Director: Liability of the National Treasury. From January 2005 until May 2011, he was the Director-General of the National Treasury of South Africa.

In 2011, Kganyago was appointed Deputy Governor of the South African Reserve Bank, serving in that capacity from May 2011 until November 2014. Two other individuals served concurrently with him, at Deputy Governor level. On 9 November 2014, he became Governor of the South African Reserve Bank, replacing the former Governor.

From 2018 until 2020, Kganyago chaired the International Monetary and Financial Committee (IMFC), the policy advisory committee of the Board of Governors of the International Monetary Fund (IMF).

In 2019, President Cyril Ramaphosa re-appointed Kganyago for another five-year term.

Other activities
 International Monetary Fund (IMF), Chairman of the International Monetary and Financial Committee (since 2018)
 Financial Stability Board (FSB), Member of the Regional Consultative Group for Sub-Saharan Africa
 Association of African Central Bankers, Chairman
 Southern African Development Community (SADC), Chair of the Committee of Central Bank Governors

Recognition
Kganyago received the 2018 Governor of the Year award at the 5th annual Central Banking Awards ceremony.

See also
 South African rand

References

Governors of the South African Reserve Bank
South African bankers
20th-century South African economists
Living people
1965 births
People from Capricorn District Municipality
21st-century South African economists